Marguerite Agniel was a Broadway actress and dancer, and then a health and beauty guru in New York in the early 20th century. She is known for her 1931 book The Art of the Body: Rhythmic Exercise for Health and Beauty, one of the first to combine yoga and nudism.

Early life

Marguerite, born 21 January 1891, was one of the six children of George Agniel, an Indiana farmer, and Ada Lescher Flowers. Her father died in 1893 while she was an infant, leaving her mother to raise all the children. The Agniel family was French-Jewish; her mother's family was English. She was married in New York on 21 March 1917.

She performed in Broadway plays including The Amber Empress with music by Zoel Parenteau in 1916, and Raymond Hitchcock's Pin Wheel in 1922.

Author

She appeared in the 15 November 1926 issue of Vogue, demonstrating slimming exercises in the form of floor stretches, with postures close to the yoga asanas Salabhasana, Supta Virasana, Sarvangasana and Halasana.
She wrote for Physical Culture magazine in 1927 and 1928.

In 1931 Agniel wrote the book The Art of the Body : Rhythmic Exercise for Health and Beauty, illustrated mainly with photographs of herself; she notes in the Preface that her dance technique derives from Ruth St. Denis (who in turn followed François Delsarte), but that her "system of 'aesthetic athletics'" was based mainly on that of Bernarr Macfadden, an advocate of physical culture. She names the sexologist Havelock Ellis and the musicologist Sigmund Spaeth as major influences, stating that both had shown "an extraordinarily intuitive understanding" of her work.

Agniel wrote a piece called "The Mental Element in Our Physical Well-Being" for The Nudist, an American magazine, in 1938; it showed nude women practising yoga, accompanied by a text on attention to the breath. The social historian Sarah Schrank comments that it made perfect sense at this stage of the development of yoga in America to combine nudism and yoga, as "both were exercises in healthful living; both were countercultural and bohemian; both highlighted the body; and both were sensual without being explicitly erotic."

Reception

Her friend the sexologist Havelock Ellis wrote in a letter to Louise Stevens Bryant (17 May 1936) that Agniel's books were "full of beautiful illustrations, nearly all of herself. She has a wonderful art of posing, & they are largely nudes, though she is no longer young."

Agniel is depicted in an "elegant, though sharply ironic" Palladium photographic print by the Canadian photographer Margaret Watkins, "Head and Hand". It shows her hand holding a portrait sculpture head of herself by Jo Davidson. This was one in a series of portraits of Agniel by Watkins that Agniel used in The Art of the Body. Devon Smither describes Agniel as "a leading health and beauty guru", and the Art of the Body as "a moralizing exercise manual" providing a mixture of exercises, advice on cosmetics, and spiritual guidance.

The scholars Mary O'Connor and Katherine Tweedie comment on Watkins's portraits of Agniel that they were circulated sometimes as artistic "nudes", sometimes as portraits, and sometimes as instances of "a regime of exercise and body modification". They write that since Agniel chose to use these photographs of herself, she is presenting them "not as the passive victim of an objectifying male gaze .. but as the means of promulgating her own vision of the world and her own expertise. She circulates her body as an image of the ideal and for commercial profit."

Works

 1931 The Art of the Body. London: Batsford.
 1931 "Dancing Mothers and Dancing Daughters", Hygeia 9:344-348
 1933 Body Sculpture. New York: E.H. & A.C. Friedrichs.
 1936 Your Figure. Garden City, N.Y.: Doubleday, Doran & Company.

See also

 Mary Bagot Stack
 Genevieve Stebbins

References 

1891 births
1971 deaths
American stage actresses
American dancers
American writers
American people of French-Jewish descent
Jewish American actresses
Jewish dancers
People associated with physical culture
20th-century American women
20th-century American Jews